Sunday Street is an album by American folk and blues singer Dave Van Ronk, released in 1976.

History
Sunday Street is Van Ronk and his guitar only. He takes on some ragtime with favorites such as The Pearls and Maple Leaf Rag as well as a return to more traditional folk and blues.

Sunday Street was re-released on CD in 1999.

Reception

Allmusic stated in their review "Van Ronk never hid his influences, but he never sounded exactly like them, either, and on this album he was very much himself. Maybe it is his greatest single album; it is certainly one of his most representative."

Track listing 
"Sunday Street" (Van Ronk) – 3:27
"Jesus Met the Woman at the Well" (Traditional) – 5:34
"Nobody Knows the Way I Feel This Morning" (Traditional) – 3:51
"Maple Leaf Rag" (Scott Joplin) – 3:59
"Down South Blues" (Traditional) – 4:35
"Jivin' Man Blues" (Traditional) – 3:03
"That Song About the Midway" (Joni Mitchell) – 3:33
"The Pearls" (Jelly Roll Morton) – 4:29
"That'll Never Happen No More" (Blind Blake) – 3:48
"Mamie's Blues" (Traditional) – 4:19
"Swinging on a Star" (Johnny Burke, Jimmy Van Heusen) – 2:38

Personnel
Dave Van Ronk – vocals, guitar

References

1976 albums
Dave Van Ronk albums